Nnenna Rachael Okonkwo (born 26 May 1987) Popularly Known as Nkoli Nwa Nsukka  is a Nigerian film actress. She is best known for the film of the same name. she bags an ambassador deal with Aquadon Water.

Life and career 
Rachael Okonkwo is from Ukpata in Uzo Uwani Local government area of Enugu State, located in South East (Nigeria). She studied at the University of Nigeria, Nsukka, in Enugu state. She started acting while she was a child, but due to lack of movie roles she switched career to dancing. She joined Nollywood in 2007 playing very minor roles. In 2008, she played a Supporting role to Ini Edo & Van Vicker in Royal War 2, also in 2010 alongside Patience Ozokwor and John Okafor in Open and Close 1&2. Her first major role and consequently her breakthrough movie came in 2014, where she played the lead character in Nkoli Nwa Nsukka as Nkoli. Her mother died in 2020.

Humanitarian activities

Children’s Easter Carnival 
Rachael Okonkwo in her own special way of giving back to the society hosts an annual carnival which aims at providing free gifts to kids and entertainment to the people. She says it enables her interact with her fans.
In 2015 Rachael hosted the first edition of the children’s Easter Carnival aimed at giving free gifts to kids during the Easter celebration in Enugu. In 2016 the second edition which was held in Onitsha had even more turnout as she was accompanied by fellow actors like Ken Erics among others to the event. The 2017 edition which was held in her city of birth Nsukka was able to gather over 5000 people, featured even more celebrities like Angela Okorie, Nonso Diobi, Slowdog, Ken Erics, Nani Boi, Eve Esin and supported by top brands enabled it to be an even bigger event than its predecessors.

Awards

Selected filmography

References

External links
 
 Rachael Okonkwo official website

Living people
Igbo television personalities
1987 births
Igbo actresses
21st-century Nigerian actresses
Actresses from Enugu State
Nigerian film actresses
Nigerian female models
University of Nigeria alumni